The 2008–09 Milwaukee Bucks season is the 41st season of the franchise in the National Basketball Association (NBA).

Key dates
 June 26: The 2008 NBA draft took place in New York City.
 July 1: The free agency period started.
 October 6: The pre-season started with a game against the Minnesota Timberwolves.
 October 28: The regular season started with a game against the Chicago Bulls.

Offseason
On Monday April 21, 2008, the Bucks introduced Scott Skiles as their new coach.  Skiles becomes the 11th head coach in the history of the franchise.  Skiles was a former coach with the Chicago Bulls and Phoenix Suns coach. He agreed to a four-year deal to replace his close friend, Larry Krystkowiak.
Skiles stated that he is not backing away from his reputation for demanding a lot from his players.  Skiles, 44, has amassed an overall record of 281-251 (.528) as an NBA head coach.  He was hired as head coach of the Bulls on November 28, 2003, and inherited a team with a record of 4 wins and 12 losses. While in Chicago, Skiles led the Bulls to three postseason appearances. The Bulls won 49 games in 2006–07, their most since they went 62-20 in ’97-98.  In the playoffs, the Bulls swept the defending NBA champion Miami Heat 4-0 in the first round of the 2007 NBA playoffs.

Draft picks

Roster

Pre-season

|- align="center" bgcolor="#ffcccc"
| 1 || October 6 || Minnesota Timberwolves || 117–79 || C. Villanueva (14) || F. Elson (8) || R. Sessions (6) || 9,873 || 0-1 recap
|- align="center" bgcolor="#ffcccc"
| 2 || October 8 || @Detroit Pistons || 71–85 || C. Villanueva (20) || A. Bogut (8) || R. Sessions (10) || 13,704 || 0-2 recap
|- align="center" bgcolor="#ffcccc"
| 3 || October 10 || Dallas Mavericks || 105–79 || R. Sessions (11) || D. Gadzuric (10) || L. Ridnour (6) || (La Crosse, Wisconsin)4,289 || 0-3 recap
|- align="center" bgcolor="#ffcccc"
| 4 || October 11 || Detroit Pistons  || 111–99 || C. Villanueva (26) || C. Villanueva (8) || M. Redd (8) || 11,122 || 0-4 recap
|- align="center" bgcolor="#bbffbb"
| 5 || October 15 || Golden State Warriors || 94–98 || A. Bogut (18) || A. Bogut (12) || L. Ridnour (12) || (Guangzhou, China)13,225 || 1-4 recap
|- align="center" bgcolor="#ffcccc"
| 6 || October 17 || @Golden State Warriors || 108–109 || C. Villanueva (26) || A. Bogut (9) || R. Jefferson (7) || (Beijing, China)15,328 || 1-5  recap
|- align="center" bgcolor="#ffcccc"
| 7 || October 23 || @Minnesota Timberwolves || 76–95 || D. Gadzuric (13) || D. Gadzuric (11) || L. Ridnour (7) || 8,850 || 1-6 recap
|- align="center" bgcolor="#ffcccc"
| 7 || October 24 || @Chicago Bulls || 104–112 OT || R. Jefferson (21) || L. Mbah a Moute (10) || L. Ridnour (7) || 21,529 || 1-7 recap
|-

Regular season

Standings

Record vs. opponents

Game log

|- bgcolor="#ffcccc"
| 1
| October 28
| @ Chicago
| 
| Michael Redd (30)
| Andrew Bogut (7)
| Charlie Bell, Tyronn Lue (5)
| United Center21,762
| 0–1
|- bgcolor="#bbffbb"
| 2
| October 29
| @ Oklahoma City
| 
| Michael Redd, Richard Jefferson, Charlie Villanueva (20)
| Charlie Villanueva (12)
| Luke Ridnour (5)
| Ford Center19,136
| 1–1

|- bgcolor="#ffcccc"
| 3
| November 1
| Toronto
| 
| Michael Redd (19)
| Andrew Bogut (9)
| Ramon Sessions (9)
| Bradley Center17,036
| 1–2
|- bgcolor="#bbffbb"
| 4
| November 2
| @ New York
| 
| Richard Jefferson, Ramon Sessions (18)
| Andrew Bogut (11)
| Ramon Sessions (8)
| Madison Square Garden18,190
| 2–2
|- bgcolor="#bbffbb"
| 5
| November 5
| Washington
| 
| Richard Jefferson (32)
| Andrew Bogut (13)
| Luke Ridnour (11)
| Bradley Center13,895
| 3–2
|- bgcolor="#ffcccc"
| 6
| November 7
| @ Boston
| 
| Richard Jefferson (20)
| Charlie Villanueva (12)
| Charlie Bell (5)
| TD Banknorth Garden18,624
| 3–3
|- bgcolor="#ffcccc"
| 7
| November 8
| Phoenix
| 
| Ramon Sessions (23)
| Andrew Bogut (11)
| Luke Ridnour (7)
| Bradley Center17,935
| 3–4
|- bgcolor="#ffcccc"
| 8
| November 11
| @ Cleveland
| 
| Richard Jefferson (19)
| Charlie Villanueva (10)
| Luke Ridnour, Charlie Villanueva, Ramon Sessions (4)
| Quicken Loans Arena19,842
| 3–5
|- bgcolor="#bbffbb"
| 9
| November 12
| San Antonio
| 
| Richard Jefferson (19)
| Andrew Bogut (17)
| Andrew Bogut, Charlie Bell (4)
| Bradley Center14,036
| 4–5
|- bgcolor="#bbffbb"
| 10
| November 14
| @ Memphis
| 
| Richard Jefferson (26)
| Luc Mbah a Moute (17)
| Luke Ridnour (7)
| FedExForum11,308
| 5–5
|- bgcolor="#ffcccc"
| 11
| November 15
| Boston
| 
| Andrew Bogut (20)
| Luc Mbah a Moute, Andrew Bogut (9)
| Ramon Sessions (6)
| Bradley Center17,952
| 5–6
|- bgcolor="#ffcccc"
| 12
| November 18
| @ Denver
| 
| Charlie Bell (25)
| Austin Croshere, Ramon Sessions (6)
| Ramon Sessions (6)
| Pepsi Center14,413
| 5–7
|- bgcolor="#ffcccc"
| 13
| November 19
| @ Utah
| 
| Richard Jefferson (25)
| Andrew Bogut (20)
| Luke Ridnour (6)
| EnergySolutions Arena19,911
| 5–8
|- bgcolor="#bbffbb"
| 14
| November 21
| New York
| 
| Charlie Villanueva (20)
| Andrew Bogut (17)
| Ramon Sessions (10)
| Bradley Center14,898
| 6–8
|- bgcolor="#bbffbb"
| 15
| November 22
| @ Charlotte
| 
| Ramon Sessions (18)
| Andrew Bogut (17)
| Ramon Sessions, Andrew Bogut (4)
| Time Warner Cable Arena12,096
| 7–8
|- bgcolor="#ffcccc"
| 16
| November 24
| @ Orlando
| 
| Richard Jefferson (25)
| Charlie Villanueva (9)
| Ramon Sessions (8)
| Amway Arena16,245
| 7–9
|- bgcolor="#ffcccc"
| 17
| November 26
| @ Atlanta
| 
| Richard Jefferson (25)
| Luc Mbah a Moute (8)
| Ramon Sessions (8)
| Philips Arena15,730
| 7–10
|- bgcolor="#ffcccc"
| 18
| November 28
| @ Detroit
| 
| Ramon Sessions, Richard Jefferson (21)
| Dan Gadzuric (12)
| Ramon Sessions, Charlie Bell, Luke Ridnour (4)
| The Palace of Auburn Hills22,076
| 7–11
|- bgcolor="#ffcccc"
| 19
| November 29
| Cleveland
| 
| Michael Redd (20)
| Charlie Villanueva (8)
| Ramon Sessions (8)
| Bradley Center16,237
| 7–12

|- bgcolor="#bbffbb"
| 20
| December 3
| Chicago
| 
| Charlie Villanueva (23)
| Dan Gadzuric (14)
| Luke Ridnour (10)
| Bradley Center13,684
| 8–12
|- bgcolor="#bbffbb"
| 21
| December 5
| Charlotte
| 
| Michael Redd (25)
| Andrew Bogut (10)
| Luke Ridnour (6)
| Bradley Center14,875
| 9–12
|- bgcolor="#ffcccc"
| 22
| December 7
| @ L.A. Lakers
| 
| Joe Alexander (15)
| Andrew Bogut (9)
| Ramon Sessions (6)
| Staples Center18,997
| 9–13
|- bgcolor="#ffcccc"
| 23
| December 9
| @ Phoenix
| 
| Charlie Villanueva (24)
| Andrew Bogut (11)
| Luke Ridnour (10)
| US Airways Center18,422
| 9–14
|- bgcolor="#ffcccc"
| 24
| December 10
| @ Golden State
| 
| Michael Redd (27)
| Charlie Villanueva (11)
| Luke Ridnour (5)
| Oracle Arena18,375
| 9–15
|- bgcolor="#bbffbb"
| 25
| December 13
| Indiana
| 
| Michael Redd (27)
| Andrew Bogut (20)
| Luke Ridnour (6)
| Bradley Center14,921
| 10–15
|- bgcolor="#bbffbb"
| 26
| December 15
| @ Miami
| 
| Michael Redd (21)
| Andrew Bogut (11)
| Michael Redd, Charlie Villanueva (5)
| American Airlines Arena15,029
| 11–15
|- bgcolor="#ffcccc"
| 27
| December 17
| @ Philadelphia
| 
| Charlie Bell, Luke Ridnour (14)
| Michael Redd, Andrew Bogut, Charlie Villanueva (8)
| Michael Redd (5)
| Wachovia Center11,538
| 11–16
|- bgcolor="#bbffbb"
| 28
| December 19
| @ New York
| 
| Michael Redd (21)
| Andrew Bogut (13)
| Luke Ridnour (7)
| Madison Square Garden19,009
| 12–16
|- bgcolor="#bbffbb"
| 29
| December 20
| L.A. Clippers
| 
| Richard Jefferson (22)
| Richard Jefferson, Luc Mbah a Moute (9)
| Luke Ridnour (7)
| Bradley Center15,014
| 13–16
|- bgcolor="#bbffbb"
| 30
| December 23
| Utah
| 
| Michael Redd (27)
| Andrew Bogut (11)
| Luke Ridnour (11)
| Bradley Center14,888
| 14–16
|- bgcolor="#ffcccc"
| 31
| December 27
| Detroit
| 
| Andrew Bogut (17)
| Andrew Bogut (10)
| Luke Ridnour (5)
| Bradley Center17,086
| 14–17
|- bgcolor="#bbffbb"
| 32
| December 30
| @ San Antonio
| 
| Michael Redd (25)
| Andrew Bogut (14)
| Luke Ridnour (6)
| AT&T Center18,797
| 15–17
|- bgcolor="#ffcccc"
| 33
| December 31
| @ Houston
| 
| Michael Redd (20)
| Andrew Bogut (9)
| Luke Ridnour (11)
| Toyota Center18,228
| 15–18

|- bgcolor="#bbffbb"
| 34
| January 2
| Charlotte
| 
| Michael Redd (31)
| Luc Mbah a Moute (9)
| Luke Ridnour (5)
| Bradley Center15,107
| 16–18
|- bgcolor="#ffcccc"
| 35
| January 3
| @ Charlotte
| 
| Richard Jefferson (19)
| Richard Jefferson, Charlie Villanueva (7)
| Michael Redd (5)
| Time Warner Cable Arena14,201
| 16–19
|- bgcolor="#bbffbb"
| 36
| January 5
| Toronto
| 
| Michael Redd (35)
| Luc Mbah a Moute (11)
| Ramon Sessions (8)
| Bradley Center12,599
| 17–19
|- bgcolor="#ffcccc"
| 37
| January 7
| Philadelphia
| 
| Richard Jefferson (27)
| Charlie Villanueva, Dan Gadzuric (7)
| Michael Redd (7)
| Bradley Center13,381
| 17–20
|- bgcolor="#bbffbb"
| 38
| January 9
| New Jersey
| 
| Michael Redd (24)
| Luc Mbah a Moute (7)
| Ramon Sessions (10)
| Bradley Center15,768
| 18–20
|- bgcolor="#ffcccc"
| 39
| January 10
| @ Minnesota
| 
| Michael Redd (32)
| Luke Ridnour (9)
| Luke Ridnour (6)
| Target Center15,007
| 18–21
|- bgcolor="#bbffbb"
| 40
| January 12
| @ Washington
| 
| Michael Redd (29)
| Andrew Bogut, Luc Mbah a Moute (10)
| Luke Ridnour (10)
| Verizon Center13,510
| 19–21
|- bgcolor="#ffcccc"
| 41
| January 14
| Miami
| 
| Luke Ridnour (25)
| Andrew Bogut (11)
| Joe Alexander (5)
| Bradley Center15,271
| 19–22
|- bgcolor="#bbffbb"
| 42
| January 16
| @ Sacramento
| 
| Michael Redd (44)
| Charlie Villanueva (12)
| Luke Ridnour (10)
| ARCO Arena11,663
| 20–22
|- bgcolor="#ffcccc"
| 43
| January 17
| @ L.A. Clippers
| 
| Richard Jefferson (26)
| Luc Mbah a Moute (6)
| Luke Ridnour (8)
| Staples Center16,448
| 20–23
|- bgcolor="#ffcccc"
| 44
| January 19
| @ Portland
| 
| Charlie Villanueva, Richard Jefferson (23)
| Charlie Villanueva (10)
| Tyronn Lue (4)
| Rose Garden20,580
| 20–24
|- bgcolor="#bbffbb"
| 45
| January 21
| Dallas
| 
| Charlie Villanueva (32)
| Charlie Villanueva (10)
| Richard Jefferson (8)
| Bradley Center13,898
| 21–24
|- bgcolor="#ffcccc"
| 46
| January 23
| @ Atlanta
| 
| Charlie Villanueva (27)
| Luc Mbah a Moute (10)
| Tyronn Lue, Michael Redd, Luke Ridnour (4)
| Philips Arena18,556
| 21–25
|- bgcolor="#bbffbb"
| 47
| January 24
| Sacramento
| 
| Richard Jefferson (20)
| Francisco Elson (12)
| Luke Ridnour (8)
| Bradley Center15,379
| 22–25
|- bgcolor="#ffcccc"
| 48
| January 26
| Minnesota
| 
| Ramon Sessions (18)
| Richard Jefferson, Francisco Elson (9)
| Luke Ridnour (9)
| Bradley Center12,914
| 22–26
|- bgcolor="#ffcccc"
| 49
| January 28
| @ Indiana
| 
| Charlie Villanueva (28)
| Charlie Villanueva (8)
| Charlie Villanueva, Luke Ridnour (4)
| Conseco Fieldhouse12,143
| 22–27
|- bgcolor="#bbffbb"
| 50
| January 30
| @ Toronto
| 
| Charlie Villanueva (26)
| Charlie Villanueva (13)
| Ramon Sessions (6)
| Air Canada Centre18,791
| 23–27
|- bgcolor="#bbffbb"
| 51
| January 31
| Atlanta
| 
| Charlie Villanueva (27)
| Francisco Elson (8)
| Luke Ridnour (9)
| Bradley Center15,881
| 24–27

|- bgcolor="#ffcccc"
| 52
| February 3
| @ New Jersey
| 
| Richard Jefferson (27)
| Dan Gadzuric (9)
| Luke Ridnour (7)
| Izod Center10,102
| 24–28
|- bgcolor="#ffcccc"
| 53
| February 7
| Detroit
| 
| Ramon Sessions (44)
| Francisco Elson (8)
| Ramon Sessions (12)
| Bradley Center17,297
| 24–29
|- bgcolor="#bbffbb"
| 54
| February 9
| Houston
| 
| Ramon Sessions (26)
| Charlie Villanueva (8)
| Ramon Sessions (7)
| Bradley Center13,904
| 25–29
|- bgcolor="#bbffbb"
| 55
| February 11
| Indiana
| 
| Richard Jefferson (32)
| Luc Mbah a Moute (11)
| Ramon Sessions (17)
| Bradley Center13,486
| 26–29
|- bgcolor="#bbffbb"
| 56
| February 17
| @ Detroit
| 
| Richard Jefferson (29)
| Ramon Sessions (9)
| Ramon Sessions (7)
| The Palace of Auburn Hills20,217
| 27–29
|- bgcolor="#ffcccc"
| 57
| February 18
| Chicago
| 
| Richard Jefferson (32)
| Charlie Villanueva (12)
| Ramon Sessions (4)
| Bradley Center15,309
| 27–30
|- bgcolor="#ffcccc"
| 58
| February 20
| Cleveland
| 
| Charlie Villanueva (26)
| Charlie Villanueva (13)
| Luke Ridnour, Charlie Villanueva (6)
| Bradley Center18,076
| 27–31
|- bgcolor="#bbffbb"
| 59
| February 22
| Denver
| 
| Charlie Villanueva (36)
| Francisco Elson (7)
| Ramon Sessions (8)
| Bradley Center14,891
| 28–31
|- bgcolor="#ffcccc"
| 60
| February 25
| @ Dallas
| 
| Charlie Villanueva (25)
| Charlie Villanueva (7)
| Ramon Sessions, Luke Ridnour (6)
| American Airlines Center19,558
| 28–32
|- bgcolor="#ffcccc"
| 61
| February 27
| @ New Orleans
| 
| Richard Jefferson (22)
| Charlie Villanueva (7)
| Richard Jefferson, Charlie Bell, Luke Ridnour (3)
| New Orleans Arena17,621
| 28–33
|- bgcolor="#bbffbb"
| 62
| February 28
| Washington
| 
| Charlie Villanueva (25)
| Dan Gadzuric (11)
| Ramon Sessions (10)
| Bradley Center15,970
| 29–33

|- bgcolor="#ffcccc"
| 63
| March 3
| New Jersey
| 
| Charlie Villanueva (24)
| Charlie Villanueva (15)
| Richard Jefferson, Luke Ridnour (6)
| Bradley Center13,967
| 29–34
|- bgcolor="#ffcccc"
| 64
| March 4
| @ Cleveland
| 
| Richard Jefferson (29)
| Charlie Villanueva (8)
| Ramon Sessions (8)
| Quicken Loans Arena20,562
| 29–35
|- bgcolor="#ffcccc"
| 65
| March 6
| @ Chicago
| 
| Richard Jefferson (27)
| Charlie Villanueva (12)
| Ramon Sessions (11)
| United Center21,186
| 29–36
|- bgcolor="#bbffbb"
| 66
| March 7
| Golden State
| 
| Richard Jefferson (35)
| Charlie Villanueva, Francisco Elson (7)
| Ramon Sessions (9)
| Bradley Center15,569
| 30–36
|- bgcolor="#ffcccc"
| 67
| March 10
| New York
| 
| Charlie Villanueva (32)
| Charlie Villanueva (9)
| Ramon Sessions (9)
| Bradley Center13,781
| 30–37
|- bgcolor="#ffcccc"
| 68
| March 13
| New Orleans
| 
| Richard Jefferson (27)
| Luc Mbah a Moute (10)
| Ramon Sessions (7)
| Bradley Center15,701
| 30–38
|- bgcolor="#bbffbb"
| 69
| March 15
| Boston
| 
| Charlie Villanueva (19)
| Keith Bogans (12)
| Ramon Sessions (7)
| Bradley Center18,134
| 31–38
|- bgcolor="#ffcccc"
| 70
| March 18
| Orlando
| 
| Charlie Villanueva (17)
| Ramon Sessions (7)
| Ramon Sessions (5)
| Bradley Center13,819
| 31–39
|- bgcolor="#ffcccc"
| 71
| March 21
| Portland
| 
| Charlie Villanueva (26)
| Charlie Villanueva (9)
| Ramon Sessions (7)
| Bradley Center17,809
| 31–40
|- bgcolor="#ffcccc"
| 72
| March 25
| @ Toronto
| 
| Richard Jefferson (22)
| Luc Mbah a Moute (8)
| Charlie Bell, Ramon Sessions (7)
| Air Canada Centre17,401
| 31–41
|- bgcolor="#ffcccc"
| 73
| March 27
| @ Orlando
| 
| Charlie Bell, Ramon Sessions (19)
| Richard Jefferson, Francisco Elson (7)
| Ramon Sessions (4)
| Amway Arena17,461
| 31–42
|- bgcolor="#ffcccc"
| 74
| March 28
| @ Miami
| 
| Richard Jefferson (32)
| Dan Gadzuric (12)
| Ramon Sessions (8)
| American Airlines Arena18,108
| 31–43
|- bgcolor="#bbffbb"
| 75
| March 30
| @ New Jersey
| 
| Richard Jefferson (29)
| Richard Jefferson (10)
| Ramon Sessions (8)
| Izod Center12,205
| 32–43

|- bgcolor="#ffcccc"
| 76
| April 1
| L.A. Lakers
| 
| Richard Jefferson (29)
| Ramon Sessions (10)
| Ramon Sessions (16)
| Bradley Center18,717
| 32–44
|- bgcolor="#ffcccc"
| 77
| April 2
| @ Philadelphia
| 
| Ramon Sessions (18)
| Dan Gadzuric (6)
| Ramon Sessions (10)
| Wachovia Center17,640
| 32–45
|- bgcolor="#ffcccc"
| 78
| April 4
| Memphis
| 
| Richard Jefferson (24)
| Charlie Bell (8)
| Ramon Sessions (11)
| Bradley Center18,717
| 32–46
|- bgcolor="#ffcccc"
| 79
| April 8
| Atlanta
| 
| Keith Bogans (22)
| Charlie Villanueva (7)
| Ramon Sessions (8)
| Bradley Center13,073
| 32–47
|- bgcolor="#bbffbb"
| 80
| April 11
| Oklahoma City
| 
| Richard Jefferson (35)
| Charlie Villanueva, Richard Jefferson (9)
| Ramon Sessions (9)
| Bradley Center15,418
| 33–47
|- bgcolor="#bbffbb"
| 81
| April 13
| Orlando
| 
| Richard Jefferson (24)
| Ramon Sessions, Francisco Elson (8)
| Richard Jefferson, Ramon Sessions (7)
| Bradley Center14,683
| 34–47
|- bgcolor="#ffcccc"
| 82
| April 15
| @ Indiana
| 
| Richard Jefferson (31)
| Luc Mbah a Moute (11)
| Ramon Sessions (12)
| Conseco Fieldhouse14,161
| 34-48
|-

Player statistics

Transactions

Overview

Trades

Free agents

Additions

Subtractions

References

Milwaukee Bucks seasons
Milwaukee
Milwaukee Bucks season
Milwaukee Bucks season